Aesthetician may refer to:
 A specialist in philosophical aesthetics 
 List of aestheticians
 Aesthetician, a cosmetologist who specializes in the study of skin care